Yoshio Watanabe FRPSL (1933-?) was a Japanese philatelist who was appointed to the Roll of Distinguished Philatelists in 2001. He specialises in the classic stamps of Japan and his exhibits have won the Grand Prix National at PHILANIPPON 81 and the FIAP Grand Prix at SINGPEX 94, as well as Gold medals at LONDON 90 and GRANADA 92. He was a fellow of the Royal Philatelic Society London.

References

Signatories to the Roll of Distinguished Philatelists
Fellows of the Royal Philatelic Society London
Japanese philatelists
1933 births
Philately of Japan
Living people